Song Zhaoxiang is a Chinese taekwondo practitioner. He is a two-time bronze medalist at the World Taekwondo Championships.

In 2019, he won one of the bronze medals in the men's middleweight event at the World Taekwondo Championships held in Manchester, United Kingdom. In the same year, he also won one of the bronze medals in the men's event at the 2019 World Cup Taekwondo Team Championships held in Wuxi, China.

References

External links 
 

Living people
Year of birth missing (living people)
Place of birth missing (living people)
Chinese male taekwondo practitioners
World Taekwondo Championships medalists
21st-century Chinese people